Carlos Alberto Palacio (born February 5, 1988 in Bogotá, Cundinamarca) is a Colombian football  midfielder, who currently plays for Fortaleza F.C. in the Categoría Primera B.

See also
Football in Colombia
List of football clubs in Colombia

References

External links
 Profile at soccerway

1988 births
Living people
Colombian footballers
Millonarios F.C. players
Deportivo Pereira footballers
Cerro Largo F.C. players
Llaneros F.C. players
Association football midfielders
Footballers from Bogotá